Pope Boniface IV (550 – 8 May 615) was the bishop of Rome from 608 to his death. Boniface had served as a deacon under Pope Gregory I, and like his mentor, he ran the Lateran Palace as a monastery. As pope, he encouraged monasticism. With imperial permission, he converted the Pantheon into a church. In 610, he conferred with Bishop Mellitus of London regarding the needs of the English Church. He is venerated as a saint in the Catholic Church with a universal feast day on 8 May.

Family and early career
Boniface was born in what is now the Province of L'Aquila. His father was a physician named John. His family was of Marsi origins according to the Liber Pontificalis. During the pontificate of Gregory the Great, Boniface was a deacon of the Roman Church and held the position of dispensator, that is, the first official in connection with the administration of the patrimonies.

Pontificate
Boniface IV was elected to succeed Boniface III but a vacancy of over nine months ensued, awaiting imperial confirmation from Constantinople. He was consecrated on either 25 August, according to Duchesne, or 15 September, according to Jaffé, in 608. The Vatican lists the official beginning of his papacy as 25 September. 

Boniface obtained leave from Emperor Phocas to convert the Pantheon in Rome into a Christian church, and on 13 May 609, the temple erected by Agrippa to Jupiter the Avenger, Venus, and Mars was consecrated by the pope to the Virgin Mary and all the Martyrs. It was the first instance in Rome of the transformation of a pagan temple into a place of Christian worship. Twenty-eight cartloads of sacred bones were said to have been removed from the Catacombs and placed in a porphyry basin beneath the high altar.

In 610, Mellitus, the first bishop of London, went to Rome "to consult the pope on important matters relative to the newly established English Church". While in Rome, he assisted at a synod then being held concerning certain questions on "the life and monastic peace of monks", and, on his departure, took to England the decree of the council together with letters from the pope to Archbishop Laurence of Canterbury and to all the clergy, to King Æthelberht of Kent, and to all the Anglo-Saxons. The decrees of the council now extant are spurious. The letter to Æthelberht  is considered spurious by Hefele, questionable by Haddan and Stubbs, and genuine by Jaffé.

Between 612 and 615, the Irish missionary Columbanus, then living at Bobbio in Italy, was persuaded by King Agilulf of Lombardy to address a letter on the condemnation of the "Three Chapters" to Boniface IV. He told the pope that he was suspected of heresy for accepting the Fifth Ecumenical Council and exhorted him to summon a council and prove his orthodoxy. There is no record of a rejoinder from Boniface.

Death
Inspired by Gregory the Great, Boniface IV converted his house into a monastery, where he retired and died on 8 May. He was succeeded by Adeodatus I, who reversed his policy favouring monasticism. Boniface IV was buried in the portico of St. Peter's Basilica. His remains were three times removed — in the tenth or eleventh century, at the close of the thirteenth under Boniface VIII, and to the new St. Peter's on 21 October 1603. Boniface IV is commemorated as a saint in the Roman Martyrology on his feast day, 8 May.

Notes

References

Citations

Sources

 

Attribution:
 Endnotes:

 Gregorovius, Ferdinand, II, 104

External links

Biography from CFPeople.org
Saints.SQPN: Boniface IV
Santiebeati: Boniface IV

 

550 births
615 deaths
People from the Province of L'Aquila
Papal saints
Popes
Italian popes
Italian Roman Catholic saints
Popes of the Byzantine Papacy
7th-century archbishops
7th-century Christian saints
7th-century popes
Burials at St. Peter's Basilica